King Kong is an American media franchise featuring the character King Kong. It was created by Merian C. Cooper. Owned by RKO Radio Pictures, Inc. (owners of the 1933 film) and now owned by Warner Bros. (owners of the 2017 film), Universal Pictures (owners of the 2005 film) with more recent films being licensed to Legendary Pictures (owners of the 2017 and 2021 films) for production with Warner Bros. Pictures handling distribution. Films featuring Kong over the years are currently owned by various studios, including Toho (for Godzilla vs. Kong and King Kong Escapes) Paramount Pictures (for King Kong), Universal Pictures (for King Kong), and Warner Bros. Pictures (for Kong: Skull Island and Godzilla vs. Kong) The film franchise consists of 12 films, 7 american films produced by RKO, Warner Bros., Legendary, Paramount Pictures, De Laurentiis Entertainment Group and Universal Pictures, 2 Japanese tokusatsu kaiju films produced by Toho, and the 1st 3 direct-to-video animated films produced by Warner Bros. Family Entertainment, BKN International and TF1 (for fanmade King Kong films). The first film King Kong (1933) was directed by Merian C. Cooper and Ernest B. Schoedsack and released by RKO Radio Pictures in 1933 and became an  classic of the genre. Toho was later inspired to make the original Godzilla (1954) after the commercial success of the 1952 re-release of King Kong (1933) and the success of The Beast from 20,000 Fathoms (1953). The success of King Kong would go on to inspire other monster films worldwide. The popularity of the films has led to the franchise expanding to other media, such as King Kong television, music, literature and Godzilla video games. King Kong has been one of the most recognizable symbols in American pop culture worldwide and remains a well-known facet of Cinema of the U.S.American films. The character of King Kong has become one of the world's most famous movie icons, having inspired a number of sequels, remakes, spin-offs, imitators, parodies, cartoons, books, King Kong comic, video games, theme park rides, and a King Kong soundtrack (2013) stage play. His role in the different narratives varies, ranging from a rampaging monster to a tragic antihero.

Following the release of the original film, a sequel was produced that same year with Son of Kong, featuring Little Kong. In the 1960s, Toho produced King Kong vs. Godzilla (1962), pitting a larger Kong against Toho's own Godzilla, and King Kong Escapes (1967), based on The King Kong Show (1966–1969) from Rankin/Bass Productions and pitting Kong against Mechani-Kong and Gorosaurus. In 1976, Dino De Laurentiis produced a modern remake of the original film directed by John Guillermin. A sequel, King Kong Lives, followed a decade later featuring a Lady Kong. Another remake of the original, this time set in 1933, was released in 2005 from filmmaker Peter Jackson. The second-most recent film, Kong: Skull Island (2017), is a reboot set in 1973 and is part of Legendary Entertainment's MonsterVerse, which began with Legendary's reboot of Godzilla in 2014 and continuing with Godzilla: King of the Monsters in 2019, in which Kong made multiple guest appearances, and a second crossover sequel, Godzilla vs. Kong, released in 2021, once again pitted the characters against one another.

History

RKO period (1933)

In 1933, RKO Radio Pictures, Inc. produced the original King Kong, which was followed by the sequel Son of Kong later the same year. The films were largely praised for effects artist Willis O'Brien's use of stop-motion effects. Both films star Robert Armstrong as Carl Denham. Ernest B. Schoedsack and Kong creator Merian C. Cooper co-directed and co-produced the first film, with Shoedsack performing those functions solo on the sequel.

Toho period (Showa) (1962–1967)
In 1962, the Japanese company Toho Co., Ltd. produced a successful crossover between King Kong and their own Godzilla franchise with King Kong vs. Godzilla, in which a larger version of Kong is pitted against Godzilla (both for their third film) and later released the stand-alone film King Kong Escapes in 1967 where Kong is instead put up against a robot version of himself called Mechani-Kong. The latter film was inspired by the Japanese-American animated King Kong TV series.

De Laurentiis period (1976–1986)
In 1976, Italian filmmaker Dino De Laurentiis produced a remake of the original film also titled King Kong, which follows the same basic plot. Though it was less well-received than the original film, it was a box office success and was followed by a 1986 sequel, King Kong Lives, in which Kong is resurrected and meets a female version of his own species and eventually forms a family.

Animated musical film (1998)
In 1998, Warner Bros. released the direct-to-video animated musical film The Mighty Kong based upon the plot of the original 1933 film. It features the voices of Jodi Benson as Ann Darrow and Dudley Moore as Carl Denham. This film also features a song score by the Sherman Brothers. At the end of the film, King Kong falls from the Empire State Building after getting out of a net that the blimps were using on him. Due to this being a family film, King Kong survives the fall.

Animated television films (2005–2006)
Between 2005 and 2006, BKN International released two animated films, Kong: King of Atlantis and Kong: Return to the Jungle, acting as spin-offs to Kong: The Animated Series.

Universal Studios period (2005)
In 2005, Universal Pictures released another remake of the 1933 film, once more titled King Kong. The movie was well received by audiences and praised for its special effects and cinematography and spawned masses of merchandise and spin-off attractions, including a highly praised video game adaptation acting as an alternate version of the movie.

The film, which was directed by Peter Jackson (then of The Lord of the Rings fame), is known for its high fidelity to the original (when compared to De Laurentiis's version) and the many visual, dialogue, and musical references to it, although some changes and additions are present, including Driscoll being a playwright and screenwriter rather than a mariner, and his sailor role being distributed to various other characters; Denham being chased by the Police; and also the crew of the Venture having their role fused with the unseen Norwegian ship's one.

Although it is not a full feature film, during this period Jackson also directed a short scene, realized in the style of the original film, replacing the long-lost "spider pit" scene, which is greatly discussed among fans. The scene is intercut with shots from the original film, and was released on the DVD of the 1933 film.

Legendary Pictures' MonsterVerse period (2017–present)
In 2017, Legendary Pictures released a reboot of the franchise with Kong: Skull Island, the second film in Legendary's MonsterVerse, a shared universe in which various kaiju films take place.  The MonsterVerse began with Gareth Edwards' 2014 film Godzilla, also a reboot, and continued with Godzilla: King of the Monsters in 2019, where Kong made multiple appearances, and a second crossover film titled Godzilla vs. Kong, released on March 24, 2021, once again pitting the two monsters against each other.

Films
From 1933 through 2021, there have been 12 King Kong films produced, with 10 American productions and 2 Japanese productions.

Television

King Kong (1966–1969) 

The 1966 a cartoon series King Kong (often referred to as The King Kong Show) features the giant ape befriending the Bond family, with whom he goes on various adventures, fighting monsters, robots, mad scientists and other threats. Produced by Rankin/Bass, the animation was provided in Japan by Toei Animation, making this the very first anime series to be commissioned out of Japan by an American company. The show debuted with an hour-long pilot episode and then was followed by 24 half-hour episodes that aired on ABC. This was also the cartoon that resulted in the production of Toho's Ebirah, Horror of the Deep (originally planned as a Kong film) and King Kong Escapes.

Kong: The Animated Series (2001) 

In 2000, an animated production from BKN International, Ellipsanime and M6 titled Kong: The Animated Series was released and is set many decades after the events of the original film. "Kong" is cloned by a scientist named Dr. Lorna Jenkins who also used the DNA of her grandson Jason to bring it to life. Jason uses the Cyber-Link to combine with Kong in order to fight evil, allowing Kong to draw on Jason's knowledge of hand-to-hand combat. The show was created in order to cash-in on Godzilla: The Series, which had repeated at least two of the monsters (although with vastly different backgrounds) seen in the Godzilla series.

Kong: King of the Apes (2016–2018) 

An animated series by 41 Entertainment titled Kong: King of the Apes aired as a Netflix original in 2016. The first episode aired as a two-hour movie followed by 12 half-hour episodes. Avi Arad is executive producer of the series. The series synopsis reads "Set in 2050, Kong becomes a wanted fugitive after wreaking havoc at Alcatraz Island's Natural History and Marine Preserve. What most humans on the hunt for the formidable animal do not realize, though, is that Kong was framed by an evil genius who plans to terrorize the world with an army of enormous robotic dinosaurs. As the only beast strong enough to save humanity from the mechanical dinosaurs, Kong must rely on the help of three kids who know the truth about him." Kong appears in Tarzan and Jane season 2 episode "The Return of the King". A live action series titled King Kong of Skull Island based on Joe Devito's book of the same name, which was produced with the Merian C. Cooper estate, is being developed by Stacy Title and Jonathan Penner.

Skull Island (TBA) 
In late January 2021, Netflix and Legendary Entertainment announced that an anime-style series adaptation based on the franchise is in the works from Powerhouse Animation Studios.

Untitled live-action television series (TBA) 
In August 2022, it was reported that a live-action television series adaptation based on the franchise is in the works for Disney+ from Disney Branded Television and Atomic Monster.

Reception

Box office performance

N/A = no know data.

Critical and public response

Cultural impact

King Kong, as well as the series of films featuring him, have been featured many times in popular culture outside of the films themselves, in forms ranging from straight copies to parodies and joke references, and in media from comic books to video games. The Beatles' 1968 animated film Yellow Submarine includes a scene of the characters opening a door to reveal King Kong abducting a woman from her bed. The Simpsons episode "Treehouse of Horror III" features a segment called "King Homer" which parodies the plot of the original film, with Homer as Kong and Marge in the Ann Darrow role. It ends with King Homer marrying Marge and eating her father.

The British comedy TV series The Goodies made an episode called "Kitten Kong", in which a giant cat called Twinkle roams the streets of London, knocking over the British Telecom Tower. The controversial World War II Dutch resistance fighter Christiaan Lindemans — eventually arrested on suspicion of having betrayed secrets to the Nazis — was nicknamed "King Kong" due to his being exceptionally tall. Frank Zappa and The Mothers of Invention recorded an instrumental about "King Kong" in 1967 and featured it on the album Uncle Meat. Zappa went on to make many other versions of the song on albums such as Make a Jazz Noise Here, You Can't Do That on Stage Anymore, Vol. 3, Ahead of Their Time, and Beat the Boots.

The Kinks recorded a song called "King Kong" as the B-side to their 1969 "Plastic Man" single. In 1972, a  fiberglass statue of King Kong was erected in Birmingham, England. The second track of The Jimmy Castor Bunch album Supersound from 1975 is titled "King Kong". Filk Music artists Ookla the Mok's "Song of Kong", which explores the reasons why King Kong and Godzilla should not be roommates, appears on their 2001 album Smell No Evil. Daniel Johnston wrote and recorded a song called "King Kong" on his fifth self-released music cassette, Yip/Jump Music in 1983, rereleased on CD and double LP by Homestead Records in 1988. The song is an a cappella narrative of the original movie's story line. Tom Waits recorded a cover version of the song with various sound effects on the 2004 release, The Late Great Daniel Johnston: Discovered Covered. ABBA recorded "King Kong Song" for their 1974 album Waterloo. Although later singled out by ABBA songwriters Benny Andersson and Björn Ulvaeus as one of their weakest tracks., it was released as a single in 1977 to coincide with the 1976 film playing in theatres.

Other media

Video games

Various electronic games featuring King Kong have been released through the years by numerous companies. These range from handheld LCD games, to video games, to pinball machines. Tiger Electronics released various King Kong games in the early 1980s, including a Tabletop LCD game in 1981, a video game for the Atari 2600 home video game system in 1982, a handheld game in 1982 in both a regular edition a large screen edition (the regular edition was later reissued by Tandy in 1984), an "Orlitronic" game (for the international markets) in 1983, and a color "Flip-Up" game in 1984.

Epoch Co. released two LCD games in 1982. One was King Kong: New York, and the other was King Kong: Jungle Konami released two games based on the film King Kong Lives in 1986. The first game was King Kong 2: Ikari no Megaton Punch for the Famicom, and the second was King Kong 2: Yomigaeru Densetsu, for the MSX computer. In 1988, Konami featured the character in the crossover game Konami Wai Wai World. All of these games were only released in Japan. Data East planned to release a pinball machine called King Kong: The Eighth Wonder of the World in 1990, but only 9 units were made. In 1992, Nintendo produced an educational game called Mario is Missing that features a treasure hunt level involving King Kong in New York City. The character is represented by images of his arm grabbing the Empire State Building in the NES version and a full body statue in the SNES version. Bam! Entertainment released a Game Boy Advance game based on Kong: The Animated Series in 2002. MGA Entertainment released an electronic handheld King Kong game (packaged with a small figurine) in 2003. Majesco Entertainment released a Game Boy Advance game based on the straight to video animated film Kong: King of Atlantis in 2005.

In 2005, Ubisoft released two video games based on the 2005 King Kong. Peter Jackson's King Kong: The Official Game of the Movie was released on all video game platforms, while Kong: The 8th Wonder of the World was released for the Game Boy Advance. Also to tie into the film, Gameloft released King Kong: The Official Mobile Game of the Movie for mobile phones, while Radio Shack released a miniature pinball game. Taiyo Elec Co released a King Kong Pachinko game in 2007.

King Kong has been featured in various online casino games. NYX gaming developed a King Kong online video slot casino game in 2016. In 2017, Ainsworth Game Technology developed two licensed King Kong casino games. King Kong and Kong of Skull Island, while in 2018, NExtGen Gaming released a game called King Kong Fury. King Kong appears in the Warner Bros. Interactive Entertainment game Lego Dimensions. He appears as a boss in The Lego Batman Movie pack. 

In 2021, Raw Thrills released a cinematic virtual reality motion game called King Kong of Skull Island.

Also in 2021, King Kong became a playable character in the Toho mobile game Godzilla Battle Line as part of a crossover promotion with the film Godzilla vs. Kong.

In 2022, King Kong appears as a non-playable character alongside Godzilla in Call of Duty: Warzone. Once again as part of a crossover promotion with Godzilla vs. Kong, the update is titled Operation Monarch. A cosmetic outfit based on Kong is also released for both Warzone and Call of Duty: Vanguard.

Also in 2022, King Kong appeared in the mobile game Kong Skull Island x Evony: The King's Return as a tie in to the film Kong Skull Island by Evony, LLC.

Besides starring in his own games, King Kong was the obvious influence behind other city-destroying gigantic apes, such as George from the Rampage series, Woo from King of the Monsters (who was modeled after the Toho version of the character), and Congar from War of the Monsters, as well as giant apes worshiped as deities, like Chaos and Blizzard from Primal Rage.

Literature

Over the decades, there have been numerous books, novels, and comic books based on King Kong by various publishers.

In December 1932, as the film King Kong was finishing production, Merian C. Cooper asked his friend Delos W. Lovelace to adapt the film's screenplay into a novelization. Published by Grosset & Dunlap, the book was released later that month on December 27, 1932, just over 2 months before the film premiered on March 2, 1933. This was a part of the film's advance marketing campaign. The novelization was credited as being based on the "Screenplay by James A. Creelman and Ruth Rose. Novelized from the Radio Picture". The byline written under the title was "Conceived by Edgar Wallace and Merian C. Cooper". However, despite the credit, Wallace had very little to do with the story or the character. In an interview, author-artist Joe DeVito explains:

This conclusion about Wallace's contribution was verified in the book The Making of King Kong by Orville Goldner and George E. Turner (1975) where Wallace stated in his diary, "Merian Cooper called and we talked over the big animal play we are going to write, or rather I am writing and he is directing", and "An announcement has been made in the local press that I am doing a super horror story with Merian Cooper, but the truth is it is much more his story than mine...I shall get much more credit out of the picture than I deserve if it is a success, but I shall be blamed by the public if it is a failure which seems fair". Wallace died of pneumonia complicated by diabetes on February 10, 1932, and Cooper later had James Creelman and finally Ruth Rose finish the screenplay. Cooper would later state "Actually, Edgar Wallace didn't write any of Kong, not one bloody word...I'd promised him credit and so I gave it to him".

Cooper issued a reprint of the novelization in 1965 that was published by Bantam Books. Some time later, the copyright expired and the publishing rights to the book fell into the public domain. Since then a myriad of publishers have reprinted the novelization numerous times. In 1983, Judith Conaway wrote a juvenile adaptation of the novelization called King Kong (Step Up Adventures) that featured illustrations by Mike Berenstain and was published by Random House books, while Anthony Browne wrote and illustrated another juvenile adaptation called Anthony Browne's King Kong in 1994. Credited as "From the Story Conceived by Edgar Wallace & Merian C. Cooper", the book was published by the Turner Publishing Company. It was re-released as a paperback in the U.K in 2005 by Picture Corgi. Blackstone Audio produced an audio recording of the book in 2005 narrated by Stefan Rudnicki, while StarWarp Concepts released an Ebook version complete with 6 new illustrations from pulp-comic artist Paul Tuma in 2017.

Outside of the novelization, the film was serialized in a pulp magazine. In 1933, Mystery magazine published a King Kong serial under the byline of Edgar Wallace, and written by Walter F. Ripperger. This serialization was published in two parts in the February and March issues of the magazine.

In the U.K, the film was serialized in two different pulps, both on October 28, 1933: in the juvenile Boys Magazine (Vol. 23, No. 608). where the serialization was uncredited, and in that month's issue of Cinema Weekly where it was credited to Edgar Wallace and written by Draycott Montagu Dell (1888–1940). This short story adaptation would later appear in the Peter Haining book called Movie Monsters in 1988, published by Severn House in the U.K. The novel was serialized in the London Daily Herald by  H. Kingsley Long as well. The serialization was first published in April 1933 and ran 37 installments.

In 1973, Philip Jose Farmer wrote a short story sequel to the Lovelace novelization called After King Kong Fell that was published in OMEGA: a collection of original science fiction stories.

In 1977, a novelization of the 1976 remake of King Kong was published by Ace Books. This novelization was called The Dino De Laurentiis Production of King Kong and was simply the 1976 Lorenzo Semple Jr. script published in book form. The cover was done by Frank Frazetta.

To coincide with the 2005 remake of King Kong, various books were released to tie into the film. A novelization was written by Christopher Golden based on the screenplay by Fran Walsh, Philippa Boyens, and Peter Jackson. Matt Costello wrote an official prequel to the film called King Kong: The Island of the Skull. These books were published by Pocket Books. Various illustrated juvenile books were published, as well, by Harper Books: Kong's Kingdom was written by Julia Simon-Kerr; Meet Kong and Ann and Journey to Skull Island were written by Jennifer Franz; Escape from Skull Island and Kong: The Eighth Wonder of the World—Junior Novel were written by Laura J. Burns; The Search for Kong was written by Catherine Hapka; and finally, a Deluxe Sound Storybook of Kong: The Eighth Wonder of the World was written by Don Curry. Weta Workshop released a collection of concept art from the film entitled The World of Kong: A Natural History of Skull Island that was published by Pocket Books. The book was written and designed to resemble and read like an actual nature guide and historical record.

In 2005, Ibooks, Inc., published an unofficial book featuring King Kong called Kong Reborn, by Russell Blackford.

Starting in 1996, artist/writer Joe DeVito began working with the Merian C. Cooper estate to write and/or illustrate various books based on the King Kong character. The first of these was an origin story labeled as an authorized sequel/prequel to the 1932 novelization of King Kong called Kong: King of Skull Island. This illustrated hardcover novel was published in 2004 by DH Press and featured a story DeVito co-wrote with Brad Strickland and John Michlig. It also included an introduction by Ray Harryhausen. A large paperback edition was then released in 2005, with extra pages at the end of the book. A CD audiobook narrated by Joey D'Auria was released by RadioArchives as well, and an interactive two-part app was released in 2011 and 2013, respectively, by Copyright 1957 LLC. In 2005, DeVito and Strickland co-wrote another book together called Merian C. Cooper's King Kong for the Merian C. Cooper estate. This book was published by St. Martin's Press. It was a full rewrite of the original 1932 novelization, which updates the language and paleontology and adds five new chapters. Some additional elements and characters tie into Kong: King of Skull Island, enabling the two separate books to form a continuous storyline.
In 2013, the first of two books featuring crossovers with pulp heroes was published. To coincide with the 80th anniversary of both King Kong and Doc Savage, Altus Press published Doc Savage: Skull Island in both softcover and hardcover editions. This officially sanctioned book was written by Will Murray and based on concepts by DeVito. In 2016, Altus Press published the other crossover book, this time featuring a meeting between King Kong and Tarzan. The novel, called King Kong vs. Tarzan, was once again written by Will Murray and featured artwork by DeVito. In 2017, a new book featuring another origin story, written and illustrated by DeVito, was released, called King Kong of Skull Island. Expanded versions of the book titled King Kong Skull Island: Exodus and King Kong Skull Island: The Wall were released by Markosia in 2020.

In March 2017, to coincide with the release of Kong: Skull Island, Titan Books released a novelization of the film written by Tim Lebbon and a hardcover book The Art and Making of Kong: Skull Island by Simon Ward.

In 2021, to coincide with the release of Godzilla vs Kong, various tie-in books were released. On March 30, Legendary Comics released a graphic prequel novel called Kingdom Kong written by Marie Anello, as well as a children's picture book called Kong and Me written by Kiki Thorpe and illustrated by Nidhi Chanani. 
On April 6, Titan Books released Godzilla vs. Kong: The Official Movie Novelization written by Greg Keyes. Insight Editions released a children's board book called Godzilla vs. Kong: Sometimes Friends Fight (But They Always Make Up) written by Carol Herring, and on May 21, also released Godzilla vs. Kong: One Will Fall, The Art of the Ultimate Battle Royale written by Daniel Wallace.

Theme park rides

Universal Studios has had popular King Kong attractions at Universal Studios Hollywood in Universal City, California and Universal Orlando Resort in Orlando, Florida.

The first King Kong attraction was called King Kong Encounter and was a part of the Studio Tour at Universal Studios Hollywood. Based upon the 1976 film King Kong, the tour took the guests in the world of 1976 New York City, where Kong was seen wreaking havoc on the city. It was opened on June 14, 1986, and was destroyed on June 1, 2008, in a major fire. Universal opened a replacement 3D King Kong ride called King Kong: 360 3-D that opened on July 1, 2010, based upon Peter Jackson's 2005 film King Kong.

A second more elaborate ride was constructed at Universal Studios Florida on June 7, 1990, called Kongfrontation. The ride featured a stand-alone extended version of King Kong Encounter and pinned guests escaping on the Roosevelt Island Tramway from Kong, who was rampaging across New York City. The ride was closed down on September 8, 2002, and was replaced with Revenge of the Mummy on May 21, 2004.

On May 6, 2015, Universal Orlando announced that a new King Kong attraction titled Skull Island: Reign of Kong will open at Islands of Adventure in the summer of 2016, making it the first King Kong themed ride in Orlando since Kongfrontation closed down 14 years earlier at Universal Studios Florida. It officially opened on July 13, 2016.

A Kong ride made by HUSS Park Attractions also appeared in Changzhou China Dinosaur Park and was opened in 2010. In this ride Kong will pick up your wagon, lower it down and tilt it all kinds of directions.

Musical

In mid-2012, it was announced that a musical adaptation of the story (endorsed by Merian C. Cooper's estate) was going to be staged in Melbourne at the Regent Theatre. The show premiered on June 15, 2013, as King Kong: The Eighth Wonder of The World, with music by Marius De Vries. The musical then premiered on Broadway on November 8, 2018, at the Broadway Theatre as King Kong: Alive on Broadway. The creative team included book writer Jack Thorne, director-choreographer Drew McOnie, and Australian songwriter Eddie Perfect, who replace the former creatives.

The huge King Kong puppet was created by Global Creature Technology. The puppet stands 20 feet tall and weighs 2,400 pounds. It is operated by a large rig with 10 onstage puppeteers, and features an array of microprocessors and tiny motors that power nuanced movements in the facial features. According to Sonny Tilders, who designed the Fiberglas and steel puppet for Global Creatures Company, "It’s the most sophisticated marionette puppet ever made". Tilders also stated that Kong is built in layers, and is "quite similar to genuine anatomy". Over the steel skeleton, the body shell is a mixture of hard Fiberglas, enforced inflatables, high-pressure inflatables, and bags full of styrene beans that stretch and contort like muscles. "We really wanted to create the sense that he’s a moving sculpture," stated Tilders

Other appearances
King Kong had three cameos in Warner Bros films.

In the 2017 film The Lego Batman Movie, King Kong (voiced by Seth Green) appears as an inmate of the Phantom Zone. He is among the Phantom Zone inmates that the Joker releases in order to take over Gotham City. During the Joker's campaign, King Kong destroys one of the towers that Batman and the others hide in. With help from Robin, Batgirl, Alfred Pennyworth, and his enemies, Batman is able to defeat King Kong and send him and his fellow Phantom Zone inmates back to the Phantom Zone.
 In the 2018 film Ready Player One (based on the book of the same name), King Kong appears as one of the hazards of the OASIS racetrack.
 In the 2021 film Space Jam: A New Legacy,  King Kong makes a cameo as one of the many spectators to a basketball game between the Tune Squad and the Goon Squad.

Other references
King Kong, in name only, was referenced by Ian Malcolm as a sarcastic remark toward the gates of Jurassic Park in the titular 1993 film.
A frame of King Kong in the 1933 film can be seen for a split second during the 2008 monster film Cloverfield.
Both King Kong and Skull Island were referenced and made multiple appearances in the 2019 film Godzilla: King of the Monsters.

See also
 Kaiju 
 Tokusatsu 
 Godzilla 
 MonsterVerse
 Universal City Studios, Inc. v. Nintendo Co., Ltd.

King Kong in the name

There were other movies to have borne the "King Kong" name that have nothing to do with the character.
 A lost silent Japanese short, directed by Torajiro Saito, featuring an all-Japanese cast and produced by the Shochiku company, was released in 1933. The plot revolves around a down-on-his-luck man who plays the King Kong character in a vaudeville theater to earn money to woo a girl he likes. The film does not actually involve King Kong per se.
 . A lost two-part silent Japanese period piece that was produced by a company called Zensho Kinema in 1938. The film revolves around kidnapping and revenge amongst the characters. The "King Kong" in this film is a trained ape (that looks more like a Yeti) who is used to kidnap one of the characters. Judging by the plot synopsis presented by periodicals at the time, the "King Kong" is regular-sized and is only depicted as gigantic on the advertisements for promotional purposes.
 The 1959 Hong Kong film King Kong's Adventures in the Heavenly Palace(猩猩王大鬧天宮) which featured a normal-sized gorilla.
 The Hindi films King Kong (1962) and Tarzan and King Kong (1965) which featured the professional wrestler King Kong and has nothing to do with the famous movie monster, although the latter film featured a normal-sized gorilla.
 The 1968 Italian film Kong Island (Eva, la Venere selvaggia) which was advertised in the U.S. as King of Kong Island. Despite the American title, the film featured normal-sized gorillas and takes place in Africa.
 The 1981 Mexican film Las Muñecas Del King Kong (The Dolls of King Kong) which featured exotic jungle girls. The "King Kong" in the film was simply a giant ape statue on top of a building.

Related films

 The premise of a giant gorilla brought to the United States for entertainment purposes, and subsequently wreaking havoc, was recycled in Mighty Joe Young (1949), through the same studio and with much of the same principal talent as the 1933 original. It was remade in 1998.
 King Kong bears some similarities with an earlier effort by special effects head Willis H. O'Brien, The Lost World (1925), in which dinosaurs are found living on an isolated plateau. It was based on Sir Arthur Conan Doyle's novel of the same name.
 Banglar King Kong – An unofficial Bangladeshi musical based on the King Kong story and directed by Iftekar Jahan. The film uses large amounts of stock footage from the films King Kong and Mighty Joe Young, as well as National Geographic documentaries, and premiered in June 2010 in the Purnima Cinema Hall in Dhaka.
 Other similar giant ape films include:
 The 1949 American comedy film Africa Screams, where a giant ape briefly appears.
 The 1961 British film Konga, where a chimpanzee is enlarged after being fed a growth serum by a deranged scientist and attacks London.
 The 1969 American film The Mighty Gorga, which features a circus owner's quest to capture a giant gorilla in an African jungle. Unlike King Kong, Gorga remains in Africa.
 The 1976 Korean 3D film Ape, where a giant ape runs amok in Seoul, South Korea.
 The 1976 British film Queen Kong, a film that parodies King Kong with a gender reversal between the giant ape and the object of the ape's affection.
 The 1977 Hong Kong film The Mighty Peking Man, featuring a huge Bigfoot/ape-like creature that attacks Hong Kong after it was brought to Hong Kong from its territory somewhere in India near the Himalayas.
 The 1977 Italian film Yeti: Giant of the 20th Century, featuring a giant abominable snowman running amok in Ontario after a millionaire industrialist thaws it out of a block of ice.
 The 2005 The Asylum film King of the Lost World is a mockbuster of Jackson's King Kong, loosely based on the aforementioned The Lost World.
 The 2018 American film Rampage, featuring a giant albino western lowland gorilla named George. The film is based on the 1986 arcade game Rampage, which itself is a video game parody of giant monster films.

Notes

References

 
Horror film franchises
Mass media franchises introduced in 1933